
IC 405 (also known as the Flaming Star Nebula, SH 2-229, or Caldwell 31) is an emission and reflection nebula in the constellation Auriga north of the celestial equator, surrounding the bluish, irregular variable star AE Aurigae. It shines at magnitude +6.0. Its celestial coordinates are RA  dec . It is located near the emission nebula IC 410, the open clusters M38 and M36, and the K-class star Iota Aurigae.

The nebula measures approximately 37.0' x 19.0', and lies about 1,500 light-years away from Earth. It is believed that the proper motion of the central star can be traced back to the Orion's Belt area. The nebula is about 5 light-years across.

Gallery

See also
Auriga (Chinese astronomy)
Caldwell catalogue
Cosmic dust
List of largest nebulae

Notes

Sources

External links
 
 
 
 
 
 
 

Diffuse nebulae
Emission nebulae
Reflection nebulae
0405
031b
229
Auriga (constellation)